Pechaya Wattanamontree (born 28 April 1989), who goes by the nickname Min, is a Thai model and actress.

Early life 
Pechaya is a native of Nam Phong district, Khon Kaen province. She was born on 28 April 1989, as the second child of Supat Wattanamontree (former mayor of Nam Phong district) and Kanchana Wattanamontree. Her family operates a real estate business, a housing project and is a building material distributor in Khon Kaen.

Pechaya graduated from Khon Kaen University, Secondary Division where she played basketball. She received the gold medal at the Unity No. 29 Chamchuri Games. She was an exchange student at the World Experience program at Columbia Falls High School, Montana. She graduated with a bachelor's degree from the Faculty of Liberal Arts Arts Business English from Assumption University on 18 January 2014.

Career 
Pechaya entered the fashion industry in 2006 via the "Miss Teen Thailand" contest. She finished as 1st runner-up in the media and Miss I-Mobile. Pechaya signed with Channel 7, her first lakorn (Thai drama) was Pla Boo Thong in 2009. She then performed in Reun Son Ruk  and Ruk Nai Marn Mek, Thailand's  most popular drama that year.

In 2010, Pechaya received the Most Popular Star award from institutions including the Young Rising Star Award. From  Siam Dara Star Award Hot Female Rising Star of the Year From  Inside TV Hot Awards and the Rising Star Award From Maya Pop Vote.

On November 20, Channel 7 announced that Min decided not to renew her contract with the label. She is currently a freelance actress.

Personal life 
She had a relationship with businessman Pitak Spatam (Oat). 
On November 4, Min reveals that she has been single for over 4 months. She dated Oat Pitak for over 4 years before they broke up.

Filmography

Film

Television series

Discography

Master of Ceremony: MC ON TV

Awards and nominations

References

External links

Article 
 Asianfuse
 Blogspot
 สยองข้ามประเทศ “มิน” กรี้ดลั่นตอนตี 4 เจอ “งูเจ้าที่” โผล่กลางโต๊ะเครื่องเซ่น!

Social network 
 Official Fanclub 
 
 (fan club)
 
 

1989 births
Living people
Peechaya Wattanamontree
Peechaya Wattanamontree
Peechaya Wattanamontree
Peechaya Wattanamontree
Peechaya Wattanamontree
Peechaya Wattanamontree
Peechaya Wattanamontree
Peechaya Wattanamontree